Luke Saville and Jordan Thompson were the defending champions but only Saville chose to defend his title, partnering Andrew Whittington. Saville lost in the final to Alex Bolt and Bradley Mousley.

Bolt and Mousley won the title after defeating Saville and Whittington 6–3, 6–2.

Seeds

Draw

References
 Main Draw

Canberra Tennis International - Men's Doubles
2017 in Australian tennis
2017